Rebekkah Brunson (born December 11, 1981) is an American basketball coach, currently an assistant coach with the Minnesota Lynx of the Women's National Basketball Association (WNBA). Brunson is a former forward for the Lynx and is the only player to win 5 WNBA championships. She held the WNBA record for rebounding, which she ceded to Lynx's center Sylvia Fowles in 2020.

Brunson was born in Washington, D.C. and attended Oxon Hill High School in Maryland. Brunson graduated from Georgetown University in 2004 as its women's basketball program's all-time leading rebounder. She also played on the U.S. team in the 2003 Pan American Games.

College statistics

Source

WNBA career

The Sacramento Monarchs chose Brunson in the 1st round of the 2004 WNBA Draft as the tenth overall pick.  She played in Sacramento for six seasons and contributed to the Monarchs' 2005 WNBA Championship victory.  She led the league in offensive rebounds per game (3.9) and total offensive rebounds (130) for the 2007 regular season.

After the Monarchs suspended operations in the fall of 2009, the Minnesota Lynx acquired Brunson in a dispersal draft. In 2011, Brunson tied a WNBA record with six consecutive double-doubles, and was named WNBA Player of the Month for June, the first member of the Lynx to be so honored. She was later named to the 2011 WNBA All-Star game, and started in place of an injured Candace Parker. 

Brunson led the Lynx in field goal percentage and rebounds in a year where the team had the best record in the WNBA. She was honored with her first appearance on the WNBA All-Defensive First Team; she had earned second-team honors three previous times. The Lynx would go on to win the 2011 WNBA Championship.

Brunson won her third league title in 2013. Brunson again made the All-Star Game, starting in place of the injured Brittney Griner. Brunson set the career mark for rebounds in the Finals, with 130, breaking the record held by former teammate Taj McWilliams-Franklin. She also broke McWilliams-Franklin's record for Finals games played, with 19.

In 2015, Brunson would win her fourth WNBA championship with the Lynx as they defeated the Indiana Fever in five games.

Following a finals loss in 2016 to the Los Angeles Sparks, Brunson would be selected into the 2017 WNBA All-Star Game, replacing an injured Brittney Griner, making it her fourth career all-star game appearance. As of 2017, Brunson also became the all-time league leader in career offensive rebounds.

Later on in the 2017 season, Brunson became the first player in league history to win 5 WNBA championships, as the Lynx defeated the Los Angeles Sparks in five games, avenging the previous year's Finals loss.

In 2018, Brunson passed Tamika Catchings, who had 3,317 career rebounds, to become the league's all-time rebounding leader. She was also announced as an all-star replacement for Nneka Ogwumike in the 2018 WNBA All-Star Game, making it her fifth all-star appearance. Brunson however missed the playoffs due to injury. The Lynx finished 18–16 with the number 7 seed and lost in the first round elimination game to the Los Angeles Sparks, ending their streak of three consecutive finals appearances.

Brunson officially retired in February 2020, when she was hired as assistant coach of the Lynx.

Overseas career
During WNBA offseasons, Brunson has played for Taranto, an Italian professional basketball team, for the Dynamo team based in Russia, and Dexia Namur, a professional club in Belgium, and for Nadezhda team based in Orenburg, Russia. She then played for USK Prague, with which she won the Czech League title (4–2 vs BK Brno) and reached the Women's Euroleague Top 16. She played with Dynamo Kursk, along with Lynx teammate Seimone Augustus from 2013 to 2016.

USA Basketball
Brunson was named to the team representing the US at the 2003 Pan American Games. The team lost the opening game to Cuba, then rebounded to win their next five games, including an overtime win against Brazil. They then faced Cuba for the gold medal, falling short 75–64 to take home the silver medal. Brunson shot 57% from the field, and ended up as the leading scorer as well as the leading rebounder for the USA team.

Brunson was one of 21 finalists for the 2012 U.S. Women's Olympic Basketball Team Roster. The 20 professional women's basketball players, plus one collegiate player (Brittney Griner), were selected by the USA Basketball Women's National Team Player Selection Committee to compete for the final roster which will represent the US at the 2012 Olympics in London.

Personal life
Brunson established and manages the 32 Foundation (named for her jersey number), which sponsors academic and athletic opportunities for youth in the metropolitan DC area. Rebekkah Brunson and wife Bobbi Jo Lamar Brunson welcomed their son Graham Matteo Lamar Brunson to the world on Sept. 29th, 2018. Brunson and her wife own and operate Sweet TrooVī. Sweet Troo Vi started as  Belgian waffle food truck inspired by Brunson's time playing professional basketball in Belgium and has since evolved into a mission-driven company offering authentic Liege waffles and gourmet plant-based cookies distributed at both local and national levels.

WNBA career statistics

Regular season

|-
| style="text-align:left;"| 2004
| style="text-align:left;"| Sacramento
| 34 || 1 || 14.5 || .421  || .000 || .717 || 3.6 || 0.6 || 0.6 || 0.3 || 0.8 || 4.4
|-
|style="text-align:left;background:#afe6ba;"| 2005†
| style="text-align:left;"| Sacramento
| 34 || 16 || 21.2 || .427 || .000 || .598 || 5.5 || 0.5 || 0.8 || 0.4 || 1.2 || 7.8
|-
| style="text-align:left;"| 2006
| style="text-align:left;"| Sacramento
| 34 || 17 || 17.7 || .461 || .000 || .587 || 5.6 || 0.5 || 0.6 || 0.4 || 1.1 || 6.8
|-
| style="text-align:left;"| 2007
| style="text-align:left;"| Sacramento
| 33 || 29 || 28.2 || .473 || .000 || .686 || 8.9 || 0.7 || 1.3 || 0.9 || 1.7 || 11.5
|-
| style="text-align:left;"| 2008
| style="text-align:left;"| Sacramento
| 30 || 30 || 26.0 || .500 || .000 || .671 || 7.1 || 0.4 || 1.2 || 0.6 || 1.7 || 10.9
|-
| style="text-align:left;"| 2009
| style="text-align:left;"| Sacramento
| 27 || 17 || 24.6 || .486 || .000 || .783 || 7.0 || 0.3 || 1.4 || 0.5 || 1.6 || 12.3
|-
| style="text-align:left;"| 2010
| style="text-align:left;"| Minnesota
| 30 || 30 || 30.5 || .429 || .000 || .663 || 10.3 || 0.8 || 1.2 || 0.9 || 1.6 || 11.3
|-
|style="text-align:left;background:#afe6ba;"| 2011†
| style="text-align:left;"| Minnesota
| 34 || 34 || 27.6 || .511 || .000 || .667 || 8.9 || 1.2 || 0.8 || 0.5 || 1.5 || 10.2
|-
| style="text-align:left;"| 2012
| style="text-align:left;"| Minnesota
| 31 || 31 || 27.0 || .505 || .000 || .679 || 8.9 || 1.2 || 1.1 || 0.9 || 1.2 || 11.4
|-
|style="text-align:left;background:#afe6ba;"| 2013†
| style="text-align:left;"| Minnesota
| 33 || 33 || 29.2 || .497 || 1.000 || .636 || 8.9 || 1.5 || 1.2 || 0.8 || 1.1 || 10.6
|-
| style="text-align:left;"| 2014
| style="text-align:left;"| Minnesota
| 11 || 11 || 27.5 || .395 || .000 || .714 || 8.2 || 1.5 || 0.2 || 0.7 || 0.9 || 7.2
|-
|style="text-align:left;background:#afe6ba;"| 2015†
| style="text-align:left;"| Minnesota
| 34 || 34 || 27.8 || .457 || .000 || .831 || 8.1 || 1.8 || 1.1 || 0.7 || 1.5 || 7.8
|-
| style="text-align:left;"| 2016
| style="text-align:left;"| Minnesota
| 33 || 33 || 24.6 || .477 || .000  || .857 || 7.3 || 1.8 || 0.9 || 0.2 || 0.8 || 7.4
|-
|style="text-align:left;background:#afe6ba;"| 2017†
| style="text-align:left;"| Minnesota
| 30 || 30 || 26.9 || .449 || .348  || .711 || 6.7 || 1.5 || 1.1 || 0.4 || 1.6 || 10.2
|-
| style="text-align:left;"| 2018
| style="text-align:left;"| Minnesota
| 25 || 25 || 27.7 || .405 || .375 || .673 || 6.8 || 2.4 || 0.8 || 0.5 || 1.4 || 7.2
|-
| style="text-align:left;"| Career
| style="text-align:left;"|15 years, 2 teams
| 453 || 368 || 25.2 || .466 || .341 || .692 || 7.4 || 1.1 || 1.0 || 0.6 || 1.4 || 9.2

Postseason

|-
| style="text-align:left;"| 2004
| style="text-align:left;"| Sacramento
| 6 || 0 || 13.3 || .350 || .000 || .714 || 2.8 || 0.5 || 0.3 || 0.6 || 0.5 || 3.2
|-
|style="text-align:left;background:#afe6ba;"| 2005†
| style="text-align:left;"| Sacramento
| 8 || 8 || 34.3 || .446 || .000 || .455 || 5.5 || 1.3 || 0.6 || 0.5 || 1.1 || 6.9
|-
| style="text-align:left;"| 2006
| style="text-align:left;"| Sacramento
| 9 || 0 || 17.1 || .333 || .000 || .643 || 3.6 || 0.6 || 0.3 || 0.6 || 1.0 || 6.0
|-
| style="text-align:left;"| 2007
| style="text-align:left;"| Sacramento
| 3 || 3 || 29.3 || .613 || .000 || .700 || 6.3 || 0.3 || 1.0 || 1.6 || 0.6 || 15.0
|-
|style="text-align:left;background:#afe6ba;"| 2011†
| style="text-align:left;"| Minnesota
| 8 || 8 || 30.6 || .473 || .000 || .781 || 10.8 || 1.5 || 0.8 || 0.6 || 1.6 || 11.9
|-
| style="text-align:left;"| 2012
| style="text-align:left;"| Minnesota
| 9 || 9 || 33.7 || .489 || .000 || .792 || 9.7 || 1.2 || 0.7 || 1.4 || 2.1 || 11.9
|-
|style="text-align:left;background:#afe6ba;"| 2013†
| style="text-align:left;"| Minnesota
| 7 || 7 || 32.5 || .509 || .000 || .692 || 10.1 || 2.3 || 0.7 || 0.8 || 1.7 || 10.6
|-
| style="text-align:left;"| 2014
| style="text-align:left;"| Minnesota
| 5 || 5 || 29.0 || .417 || .000 || 1.000 || 7.0 || 1.4 || 1.4 || 0.6 || 0.8 || 6.8
|-
|style="text-align:left;background:#afe6ba;"| 2015†
| style="text-align:left;"| Minnesota
| 10 || 10 || 29.5 || .435 || .000 || .650 || 7.2 || 1.7 || 1.2 || 0.5 || 1.2 || 5.3
|-
| style="text-align:left;"| 2016
| style="text-align:left;"| Minnesota
| 8 || 8 || 29.2 || .473 || .000 || .792 || 6.5 || 2.5 || 1.2 || 0.6 || 1.5 || 8.9
|-
|style="text-align:left;background:#afe6ba;"| 2017†
| style="text-align:left;"| Minnesota
| 8 || 8 || 27.9 || .361 || .111 || .793 || 6.0 || 1.6 || 1.1 || 0.5 || 1.3 || 9.5
|-
| style="text-align:left;"| Career
| style="text-align:left;"|11 years, 2 teams
| 81 || 66 || 27.0 || .447 || .091 || .726 || 7.0 || 1.4 || 0.9 || 0.7 || 1.3 || 8.4

See also
 WNBA records
 List of WNBA career rebounding leaders

References

External links

Lynx look to keep ‘Special Season’ going as second half begins

1981 births
Living people
American expatriate basketball people in China
American expatriate basketball people in the Czech Republic
American expatriate basketball people in Italy
American expatriate basketball people in Russia
American expatriate basketball people in Spain
American women's basketball players
Basketball players at the 2003 Pan American Games
Basketball players from Washington, D.C.
Georgetown Hoyas women's basketball players
Lesbian sportswomen
LGBT basketball players
LGBT people from Washington, D.C.
American LGBT sportspeople
Medalists at the 2003 Pan American Games
Minnesota Lynx coaches
Minnesota Lynx players
Pan American Games medalists in basketball
Pan American Games silver medalists for the United States
Power forwards (basketball)
Sacramento Monarchs players
Women's National Basketball Association All-Stars
United States women's national basketball team players